Humanist Action is a Chilean left-wing political party, founded in 2020 by former militants of the Humanist Party.  Its leader is Tomás Hirsch, who was a presidential candidate in 1999 and 2005.

The movement was formed after the resignation of 300 members of the Humanist Party, who rejected the role of deputy Pamela Jiles in the party. 

Humanist Action is part of the Chile Digno coalition and Apruebo Dignidad. In the 2021 elections they supported the presidential candidate Gabriel Boric.

Presidential candidates 
The following is a list of the presidential candidates supported by the Humanist Action. (Information gathered from the Archive of Chilean Elections). 
2021: Gabriel Boric (won)

References

External links
 Humanist Action 

2020 establishments in Chile
Humanist Party
Left-wing politics in Chile
Libertarian socialist parties
Political parties established in 2020
Political parties in Chile